This is a list of Western Hockey League seasons since inception of the league. 

As the Canadian Major Junior Hockey League (CMJHL):

1966–67

As the Western Canada Hockey League (WCHL):

1967–68 |
1968–69 |
1969–70 |
1970–71 |
1971–72 |
1972–73 |
1973–74 |
1974–75 |
1975–76 |
1976–77

1977–78

As the  Western Hockey League (WHL)

1978–79 |
1979–80 |
1980–81 |
1981–82 |
1982–83 |
1983–84 |
1984–85 |
1985–86 |
1986–87 |
1987–88

1988–89 |
1989–90 |
1990–91 |
1991–92 |
1992–93 |
1993–94 |
1994–95 |
1995–96 |
1996–97 |
1997–98 

1998–99 |
1999–00 |
2000–01 |
2001–02 |
2002–03 |
2003–04 |
2004–05 |
2005–06 |
2006–07 |
2007–08

2008–09 |
2009–10 |
2010–11 |
2011–12 |
2012–13 |
2013–14 |
2014–15 |
2015–16 |
2016–17 |
2017–18

2018–19 |
2019–20 |
2020–21 |
2021–22 |
2022–23

See also
Western Hockey League
List of OHL seasons
List of QMJHL seasons
NHL Entry Draft

Season - WHL
WHL
WHL